Vincent "Vince" Mennie (born 19 May 1964) is a Scottish–German former professional footballer who played as a midfielder for 1. FC Köln. He was the first Scot to play in the Bundesliga. He also played for Dundee, Falkirk, Forfar Athletic and Wuppertaler SV.

Career

In Germany
Born in Dortmund in the German state of North Rhine-Westphalia, Mennie was a tough midfield player. He was the first Scotsman to play in the Bundesliga where he began his senior career. He was also the first Scot to score there. He played 29 first team league games for a club North Rhine-Westphalia club, FC Köln from 1983. During his third season he transferred to Scotland.

In Scotland
Aged 21, his first club in Scotland was Dundee where he made 64 league appearances between seasons from 1985-86 to 1988-89.

During season 1988-89 he joined Falkirk for whom he played in seven league games. The season after he played in one league game for Forfar Athletic.

Return to Germany
After his brief period at Forfar he returned to play for another club in North Rhine-Westphalia, Wuppertaler SV. At the time Wuppertaler SV were playing in the Amateur Oberliga Nordrhein (III) in the regionalised third tier of German football.

References

1964 births
Living people
Footballers from Dortmund
German footballers
Scottish footballers
German people of Scottish descent
Association football midfielders
Scottish Football League players
Bundesliga players
1. FC Köln players
Dundee F.C. players
Falkirk F.C. players
Forfar Athletic F.C. players
Wuppertaler SV players
German expatriate footballers
German expatriate sportspeople in Scotland
Expatriate footballers in Scotland